Seiji Takahashi (高橋聖二), born February 24, 1993, is a Japanese professional ice hockey forward currently playing for the Oji Eagles of the Asia League.

Since 2011 he plays for the Oji Eagles. He also plays in the senior Japan national team since 2012.

References

Oji Eagle's players profile

1993 births
People from Tomakomai, Hokkaido
Japanese ice hockey forwards
Living people
Oji Eagles players
Sportspeople from Hokkaido
Asian Games bronze medalists for Japan
Medalists at the 2017 Asian Winter Games
Asian Games medalists in ice hockey
Ice hockey players at the 2017 Asian Winter Games